Robert Naeye is an American astronomer, popular science writer and magazine editor.

Early life 
He was born and raised in Hershey, Pennsylvania. He still lives in Hershey, Pennsylvania.

His ancestry can be traced to the Flanders region of The Netherlands. He is unrelated to the Belgian cyclist of the same name Robert Naeye.

Education 
He completed his master’s degree in science journalism from the Boston University.

Career

NASA 
He briefly worked for the NASA for 16 months at its Goddard Space Flight Center in Greenbelt, Maryland.

As magazine editor 
He has served as the editor in chief of two magazines:

 Sky & Telescope
 Mercury (magazine)

Bibliography 
His notable books include:
 Through the Eyes of Hubble: The Birth, Life, and Violent Death of Stars 
 Signals from Space: The Chandra X-ray Observatory

Awards and honours 
 In 2002, the Astronomical Association of Northern California honored him with its Professional Astronomer of the Year Award
 In 2002, he won the David N. Schramm Award for Science Journalism from the American Astronomical Society’s High Energy Astrophysics Division

References

External links 
 Profile
 Official Biography
 Official Website

Living people
20th-century American physicists
21st-century American physicists
Gravitational-wave astronomy
Particle physicists
American relativity theorists
Scientists from California
Year of birth missing (living people)